Hooker is an unincorporated community in Turner County, in the U.S. state of South Dakota.

History
Hooker was founded in 1894, and named for John Hooker, a pioneer settler. The post office in Hooker closed in 1954.

References

Unincorporated communities in Turner County, South Dakota
Unincorporated communities in South Dakota